The 31st Annual GMA Dove Awards were held on April 20, 2000, recognizing accomplishments of musicians for the year 1999. The show was held at the Grand Ole Opry House in Nashville, Tennessee, and was hosted by Kathie Lee Gifford.

Award recipients
Song
 "This Is Your Time" by Michael W. Smith & Wes King 
Songwriter
 Michael W. Smith 
Male Vocalist
 Steven Curtis Chapman 
Female Vocalist
 Jaci Velasquez 
Group
 Sixpence None the Richer 
Artist
 Steven Curtis Chapman 
New Artist
 Ginny Owens 
Producer
 Brown Bannister 
Southern Gospel Album
 God Is Good by The Gaither Vocal Band 
Southern Gospel Recorded Song
 "Healing" from Faithful by The Cathedrals 
Inspirational Album
 Be Still My Soul by Selah (Jason Kyle, Todd Smith, Allan Hall) 
Inspirational Recorded Song
 "I Will Follow Christ" from Clay Crosse by Clay Crosse, Steve Siler 
Pop/Contemporary Album
 Speechless by Steven Curtis Chapman 
Pop/Contemporary Recorded Song
 "Dive" from Speechless by Steven Curtis Chapman 
Contemporary Gospel Album (Formerly Contemporary Black Gospel)
 Anointed by Anointed (Keith Crouch, Tony Rich, Chris Harris, Mark Heimermann, Wayne Tester, Kern Brantley) 
Contemporary Gospel Recorded Song (Formerly Contemporary Black Gospel)
 "Power" from The Prince of Egypt-Inspirational by Fred Hammond and Radical for Christ
Traditional Gospel Album (Formerly Traditional Black Gospel)
 Healing—Live In Detroit by Richard Smallwood with Vision 
Traditional Gospel Recorded Song (Formerly Traditional Black Gospel)
 "God Can" from God Can & God Will by Dottie Peoples 
Urban Recorded Song
 "Anything Is Possible" from Anointed by Anointed (Nee-C Walls-Allen, Steve Crawford, Da'dra Crawford Greathouse, Keith Crouch, John Smith, Sherree Ford Payne) 
Country Album
 A Glen Campbell Christmas by Glen Campbell
Country Recorded Song
 "Angel Band" from Vestal and Friends by Vestal Goodman, George Jones 
Rock Album
 Time by Third Day 
Rock Recorded Song
 "Get Down" from Underdog by Audio Adrenaline (Mark Stuart, Bob Herdman, Will McGinniss, Ben Cissell, Tyler Burkum)
Hard Music Album
 Point #1 by Chevelle 
Hard Music Recorded Song
 "Mia" from Point #1 by Chevelle (Pete Loeffler, Joe Loeffler, Sam Loeffler)
Rap/Hip Hop Album
 Power by Raze 
Rap/Hip Hop Recorded Song
 "They All Fall Down” from Grammatical Revolution by Grits (T Carter, S Jones, R Robbins, O Price)
Modern Rock Album
 Candycoatedwaterdrops by Plumb 
Modern Rock Recorded Song
 "Unforgetful You" from If I Left the Zoo by Jars of Clay (Dan Haseltine, Matt Odmark, Steve Mason, Charlie Lowell)
Instrumental Album
 Majesty And Wonder by Phil Keaggy 
Praise And Worship Album
 Sonicflood by SONICFLOOd (Bryan Lenox, Jeff Deyo, Jason Halbert, Dwayne Larring, Aaron Blanton) 
Children's Music Album
 Larry-Boy: The Soundtrack by Veggie Tales (Kurt Heinecke, Mike Nawrocki, Masaki, David Mullen) 
Musical
 A Christmas To Remember by Claire Cloninger, Gary Rhodes 
Youth/Children's Musical
 Lord, I Lift Your Name On High by Karla Worley, Steven V. Taylor 
Choral Collection
 High & Lifted Up by Carol Cymbala
Special Event Album
 Streams by Cindy Morgan, Maire Brennan, Michael McDonald, Sixpence None the Richer, Chris Rodriguez, Michelle Tumes, 4HIM, Delirious?, Amy Grant, Jaci Velasquez, Burlap to Cashmere, Point of Grace 
Short Form Music Video
 This Is Your Time by Michael W. Smith (Amy Marsh) 
Long Form Music Video
 The Supernatural Experience by dc Talk (Eric Welch, Dan Pitts) 
Recorded Music Packaging
 Streams by Various (Loren Balman, Chuck Hargett) 
Bluegrass Recorded Song
 "So Fine" from So Fine by Lewis Family 
Spanish Language Album
 Llegar A Ti by Jaci Velasquez 
Enhanced CD
 Without Condition by Ginny Owens 
Urban Album
 (insufficient number of eligible entries)
Bluegrass Album
 Kentucky Bluegrass by The Bishops

References 

Dove Awards
GMA Dove Awards
2000 in American music
2000 in Tennessee
GMA